Naqibullah may refer to

Naqeebullah Mehsud (1991-2018), a Pakistani national ethnic Pashtun who was killed in a fake police encounter
Mullah Naqib, also called Naqibullah  (c. 1950-2007), Afghan mujahideen commander and politician
Shahwali Shaheen Naqeebyllah, Afghan held in Guantanamo  (ISN 834)
Naqibullah (child detainee), Afghan held in Guantanamo  (ISN 913)

Arabic masculine given names